Gry is an indie/electronic music band featuring Danish female singer Gry Bagøien and German musician FM Einheit (ex-Einstürzende Neubauten).

The music of Gry can be described as electronic with elements of trip hop, live instruments, many loops and samples (also orchestral samples) with a female voice.

Their debut album The Touch Of E! was released in 1998, followed by live shows in Europe and America.

Their second album Public Recording was made in 2000 in the Marstall Theater in Munich during a public performance with numerous special guests: Alexander Hacke, Caspar Brötzmann, Æter, Anatol Baginsky, Terranova, Pan Sonic, Funkstörung, Meret Becker, Chrislo Haas, and Sebastian Hess. The song "Summer Wine" from this album, sung by Gry Bagøien and Alexander Hacke, is a cover-version of a Lee Hazlewood/Nancy Sinatra song.

In 2002, Gry Bagøien left the band and Gry disbanded.

Band members 
 FM Einheit: electro, percussive and non-percussive instruments
 Gry Bagøien: vocals
 Sjang Coenen: bass
 Saskia von Klitzing: drums

Discography

Albums 

 1998 The Touch Of E!
 2000 Public Recording

Singles, MCDs 

 1998 Touch of Me
 1998 Remixes
 1998 Everything Or All
 1998 I Never Asked
 1999 Poles Apart
 2000 Rocket
 2000 Summer Wine
 2000 Princess Crocodile

Other full-length releases 

 2000 Frost 79° 40''' (Ammer / F.M. Einheit / Pan Sonic / Gry) — (Recorded live at the Stadttheater Oberhausen'' on 28 August 1998.)

External links
 
 Gry Bagøien's official website
 F.M. Einheit's official website
 Saskia von Klitzing's Official site of (German)

Danish electronic music groups
Experimental musical groups
German electronic music groups